Eitan Kramer was a top American professional Vert Skater who holds a Guinness World Record for "highest air on a vert ramp." Kramer, a Phi Beta Kappa graduate of the University of California Los Angeles, began his professional in-line skating career at age 15.

Kramer received the Guinness Record during the 1999 MTV Sports and Music Festival 3D.

As an actor, he appeared in Honeymoon With Mom (2006), "Tides of War" (2005) and Rollerball (2002).

He is the inventor of MorfBoard, a modular action sports system for kids.

Vert competitions 
1999 MTV SMF3D Guinness Record Holder- 14 ft
1997 ASA, Milwaukee, First Place Vert 
1997 ASA, NYC, Third Place Vert 
1997 X Games, Orlando, FL, Trials Fourth Place Vert 
1997 X Games, Providence, Trials First Place Vert 
1996 ASA, New York City, First Place 
1996 MISS, Venice Beach, Third Place 
1996 ASA, Miami, FL, Second Place 
1996 Ultimate Ilnline, High Air, First Place 
1995 ASA Overall, Third Place 
1995 ASA, Chicago, IL, Second Place Vert 
1994 NISS Overall Seventh Place

References

External links

honoluluadvertiser
ziplink.net

1978 births
Living people
Vert skaters
X Games athletes
Sportspeople from New York City